Isanpur is an area located in Ahmedabad, India. Earlier It was a small village near the Ahmedabad city which is now part of the city. It has been named after Isan Malik who was a ruler of area and subordinate of emperor Kutubuddin Aibak also known as a builder of Kutub Minar.

See also 
 Jethabhai Stepwell

References

Neighbourhoods in Ahmedabad